Levent Ateş (born March 20, 1991)  is a Turkish middle-distance runner. He competes for Galatasaray Athletics. Ateş won the silver medal in the 1500m event at the 2017 European Team Championships held in Lille, France.

References

External links

Living people
1991 births
Turkish male middle-distance runners
Athletes (track and field) at the 2018 Mediterranean Games
Mediterranean Games competitors for Turkey
Galatasaray athletes
European Games competitors for Turkey
Athletes (track and field) at the 2019 European Games
21st-century Turkish people